Chikan may refer to:

 Chikan (embroidery), a style of embroidery, common in India
 Chikan (body contact), sexual harassment, especially groping on public transport in Japan
 Super Chikan, an American blues musician
 Chikan District (赤坎区), Zhanjiang, Guangdong, China
 Chikan, Kaiping (赤坎镇), town in Guangdong, China
 Chikan, Iran, a village in Komehr Rural District, Fars Province

See also

Chika (disambiguation)